This is a list of Major League Wrestling events, detailing all professional wrestling supercards held by Major League Wrestling (MLW).

Supercard events

Past events

2002

2003

2004

2017

2018

2019

2020

2021

2022

2023

Upcoming events

2023

TBA

Pay-per-view events

2019

See also

List of All Elite Wrestling pay-per-view events
List of ECW supercards and pay-per-view events
List of FMW supercards and pay-per-view events
List of GFW events and specials
List of Impact Wrestling pay-per-view events
List of National Wrestling Alliance pay-per-view events
List of NJPW pay-per-view events
List of NWA/WCW closed-circuit events and pay-per-view events
List of Ring of Honor pay-per-view events
List of Smokey Mountain Wrestling supercard events
List of WCW Clash of the Champions shows
List of WWA pay-per-view events
List of World Class Championship Wrestling Supercard events
List of WWE pay-per-view and WWE Network events
List of WWE Saturday Night Main Event shows
List of WWE Tribute to the Troops shows

References

External links
 MLW.com

Major League Wrestling events
Professional wrestling shows
Major League Wrestling